The men's 50 metre rifle, prone was a shooting sports event held as part of the Shooting at the 1948 Summer Olympics programme. It was the sixth appearance of the event. The competition was held on 3 August 1948 at the shooting ranges at London. 71 shooters from 26 nations competed.

Medalists

Results

References

Shooting at the 1948 Summer Olympics
Men's 050m prone 1948